Dugagjin Dedaj (born 15 September 1989 in Switzerland) is a Swiss footballer.

Career

In 2014, straight after Grenchen lost 10–0 to Swiss Super League club Luzern's youth team, Dedaj was released from Grenchen along with the rest of the starting eleven. However, he stated that his and the rest of the players' names were "publicly exposed on a list".  He also claimed that the way they were fired was "completely ridiculous and borders on character assassination".

References

External links
 Dugagjin Dedaj at dbFCZ

Swiss men's footballers
Living people
Association football defenders
1989 births
FC Zürich players